Lionel Abrahams (11 April 1928 – 31 May 2004) was a South African novelist, poet, editor, critic, essayist and publisher. He was born in Johannesburg, where he lived his entire life. He was born with cerebral palsy and had to use a wheelchair until 11 years of age.

Best known for his poetry, he was mentored by Herman Charles Bosman, and later edited seven volumes of Bosman's posthumously published works. Abrahams went on to become one of the most influential figures in South African literature in his own right, publishing numerous poems, essays, and two novels. Through Renoster Books, which he started in 1956, he published works by Oswald Mtshali and Mongane Wally Serote heralding the emergence of black poetry during the apartheid era.

An account of his important role in introducing black writers to PEN is given by his close friend, the writer Jillian Becker

In 1986, he married Jane Fox. That year, he was awarded honorary doctorates of literature by the University of the Witwatersrand and the University of Natal.

Novels 
 The Celibacy of Felix Greenspan: A novel in 18 stories, published by Bateleur Press, 1977
 The White Life of Felix Greenspan, published by M&G Books, 2002

Poetry 
 Journal of a New Man, published by Ad Donker, 1984
 The Writer in Sand, published by Ad Donker, 1988
 A Dead Tree Full of Live Birds, published by Snail Press, 1988
 Chaos Theory of the Heart, published by Jacana Media, 2005
 To Halley's Comet, publishers unknown.

Works about Lionel Abrahams 
 Lionel Abrahams: A Reader, ed. Patrick Cullinan, published by Ad Donker, 1988
 A Writer in Stone: South African Writers Celebrate the 70th Birthday of Lionel Abrahams, ed. G. Friedman and Roy Blumenthal, published by David Philip, 1998

References 

1928 births
2004 deaths
Jewish writers
South African male poets
South African Jews
20th-century South African poets
21st-century South African poets
20th-century South African male writers
21st-century South African male writers